Nicklaus Schandelmaier, (born 23 March 1968) is a German musician, better known by his stage name En Esch, and has been a member of the bands KMFDM, Pigface, Slick Idiot, and <PIG>.

History
En Esch, born near Frankfurt, is an orchestra percussionist, drummer, programmer, producer, guitarist and singer.  He was a member of the German industrial rock group, KMFDM, from 1985 to 1999, during which time he contributed to ten studio albums and more than a dozen singles as musician, composer and producer.

Sascha Konietzko claims to have given Esch his nickname because the latter felt that his real name was inappropriate for the stage. It is derived from the German pronunciation of his initials (N. Sch.). Esch lived in Germany until 1992, when he moved to Chicago to join Konietzko, who had moved there a year earlier.

It was at this time that Esch first worked with Pigface, whom he also toured with in the early 1990s. He released a solo album, Cheesy, in 1993.  A few years after that, Esch moved to New Orleans.

When KMFDM temporarily broke up in 1999, Esch briefly worked with the band Pizza Whore, which changed its name to Barely Legal, and included Trixie Reiss of The Crystal Method.  The band didn't last, and Esch began traveling to Canada to visit Günter Schulz, the former KMFDM guitarist.  They formed Slick Idiot, and released their first album in 2001.  They have released two more albums under that moniker since then.

Esch has since begun working actively with Pigface again, joining them on tour in 2005.

Esch was rumored to be the replacement lead singer of industrial group Rammstein, but this turned out to be a hoax.

In 2007, he began collaborating with fellow German musician Mona Mur. The two released the album 120 Tage in February 2009, and toured together in support of the release over the next two years.  Esch and Mur joined Schulz, Raymond Watts, and Mark Durante to perform at the Wax Trax! Retrospectacle in Chicago, a charity event celebrating the industrial music label, and performed KMFDM songs from the 1990s.  A second album by the duo of Esch and Mur was released in 2011.  A second solo album, Spänk, was successfully crowdfunded and released in late 2014. His third solo album, Trash Chic, was originally scheduled for release on 31 May 2016, but was postponed to 1 July.

Personal life 
Esch is a vegetarian and an animal rights activist. He currently resides in Berlin.

Partial discography

Solo
 Cheesy (1993)
 Confidence (single) (1993)
 Spänk (2014)
 Trash Chic (2016)

Slick Idiot
 DickNity (2001)
 ReDickUlous  (2003)
 Screwtinized (2004)
 Sucksess  (2009)

with Pigface
 Gub (1990)
 Welcome to Mexico... Asshole (1991)
 Fook (1992)
 Washingmachine Mouth (1992)
 Truth Will Out (1993)
 Easy Listening... (2003)
 6 (2009)

with Mona Mur
 120 Tage - The Fine Art of Beauty and Violence (2009)
 Do With Me What You Want (2011)

with FM Einheit and Mona Mur
 Terre Haute (2013)

with Pig
 The Gospel (2016)
Risen (2018)
Pain Is God (2020)

References

External links
 Slick Idiot Official Site

1968 births
Living people
German industrial musicians
KMFDM members
Missing Foundation members
Pigface members
Slick Idiot members